Holy Rosary Church is a Roman Catholic church located within the Archdiocese of Baltimore in Baltimore, Maryland. It was established to serve Baltimore's Polish community.

History
The Holy Rosary Church was established to serve the needs of the burgeoning Polish community in Baltimore. The parish was established in 1887, though the present church was built from 1927 to 1928. It is constructed of greystone in the Polish Basilica style of architecture with limestone trim. It is 200 feet long, 100 feet wide, with twin towers 125 feet tall. The north tower contains four bells, the largest of which weighs 3000 pounds. The interior is unobstructed by columns, and seats 2000. The altars are of Carrara marble. The main altar is 20 feet wide and 30 feet high. The communion rail is 80 feet long. The 3 manual Moller organ has 3000 pipes. The original parish had around 500 families, making up 2,000 people. The church celebrated its first mass on December 8, 1887. In 1889, acreage was purchased outside of Dundalk, Maryland for the construction of a parish cemetery. A parish elementary school was built not long after and the Felician Sisters were invited to teach at the school.

The parish peaked in the 1930s. At that time the church had around 2,500 families (12,000 people in all), the largest in the Archdiocese of Baltimore and the parish elementary school had an enrollment of around 1,800 children. However, the congregation began to decline after World War II. Many Polish-Americans left Baltimore for the suburbs during the 1960s and 1970s, leaving an aging population in the city. Due to declining enrollment, the church closed the parish elementary school in 1997.

The church continues to promote itself as a center for the Baltimore Polonia and actively uses the Polish language. Polish language services are held on Sunday Mass and weekdays. The church's Cardinal Hlond Polish School holds classes on the Polish language and on Polish Catholic history. A number of Polish Catholic traditions are still practiced at the church, such as "Boże Ciało" (Corpus Christi) procession, the Easter Resurrection procession, and the Holy Saturday Easter food basket blessing.

The parish church is the Archdiocesan Shrine for Divine Mercy. The dedication of the Divine Mercy Shrine occurred on the first feast day of Mary Faustina Kowalska. Notably, Pope John Paul II (who was then Karol Cardinal Wojtyla) visited and prayed at the shrine during a visit in 1976.

Fr. Ronald Pytel was a parish priest at the church. His healed heart condition was one of the miracles cited during the canonization of St. Maria Faustina Kowalski in 2000.

References

External links

 Official church website
 History of Holy Rosary Church
 Roman Catholic Archdiocese of Baltimore

Christ United Church
Polish Cathedral style architecture
Polish-American Roman Catholic parishes in the United States
Roman Catholic churches completed in 1928
Religious organizations established in 1887
Roman Catholic churches in Baltimore
Romanesque Revival architecture in Maryland
Romanesque Revival church buildings in the United States
Upper Fell's Point, Baltimore
1887 establishments in Maryland
20th-century Roman Catholic church buildings in the United States